A by-election to the Parliament of Vanuatu was held in the constituency of Port-Vila (the capital city) on 15 October 2015. It followed the death of sitting MP (former Prime Minister, and incumbent Leader of the Opposition) Edward Natapei, of the centre-left Vanua'aku Pati. Natapei died after a long illness in July. Although Port-Vila is a multi-member constituency, only one seat was vacant, and therefore only one new member was elected.

Candidates
The parliamentary Opposition parties (Vanua'aku Pati, National United Party, Melanesian Progressive Party, Land and Justice Party, Nagriamel, and Reunification Movement for Change) agreed to endorse a single candidate: Natapei's eldest son, Kenneth Natapei, also of the Vanua'aku Pati. On the government side, the Union of Moderate Parties (centre-right) also initially endorsed Kenneth Natapei, before putting forward its own candidate. Ultimately, five other candidates took part in the election alongside Natapei : Alatoi Ishmael Kalsakau (independent), Nadia Kanegai (People's Progressive Party), Allan Carlot (Natatok), Georgie Calo (Union of Moderate Parties) and Jocelyn Mete (independent).

Result
With a low turnout (approx. 27.6%), Kenneth Natapei was declared the winner by a clear margin. Following the unseating of fourteen members of Parliament upon conviction for bribery, however, President Baldwin Lonsdale dissolved Parliament on 24 November, and called a snap general election. Natapei had not yet been sworn in. He held his seat in the ensuing general election, which also saw by-election candidate Ishmael Kalsakau feature among Port-Vila's six elected representatives.

References

2015 elections in Oceania
2015 in Vanuatu
By-elections to the Parliament of Vanuatu
October 2015 events in Oceania